William Neville (15 May 1935 – 29 September 2018) was an Irish footballer from Cork who played as a forward for West Ham United.

Career
Neville played five games for West Ham in the 1957–58 season before being invalided out of the game, aged 22 with tuberculosis. He died on 29 September 2018.

References

1935 births
2018 deaths
Association football forwards
West Ham United F.C. players
English Football League players
Republic of Ireland association footballers
Republic of Ireland expatriate association footballers
Expatriate footballers in England
Association footballers from Cork (city)